Barnabas, born Joseph or Joses, was according to tradition an early Christian, one of the prominent Christian disciples in Jerusalem. According to Acts 4:36, Barnabas was a Cypriot Jew. Named an apostle in Acts 14:14, he and Paul the Apostle undertook missionary journeys together and defended Gentile converts against the Judaizers. They traveled together making more converts, and participated in the Council of Jerusalem. Barnabas and Paul successfully evangelized among the "God-fearing" Gentiles who attended synagogues in various Hellenized cities of Anatolia.

Barnabas' story appears in the Acts of the Apostles, and Paul mentions him in some of his epistles. Tertullian named him as the author of the Epistle to the Hebrews, but this and other attributions are conjecture. The Epistle of Barnabas was ascribed to him by Clement of Alexandria and others in the early church and the epistle is included under his name in Codex Sinaiticus, the earliest extant manuscript of the complete New Testament. A few modern scholars concur with this traditional attribution but it is presently a minority view.

Although the date, place, and circumstances of his death are historically unverifiable, Christian tradition holds that Barnabas was martyred at Salamis, Cyprus. He is traditionally identified as the founder of the Cypriot Orthodox Church. The feast day of Barnabas is celebrated on June 11.

Barnabas is usually identified as the cousin of Mark the Evangelist on the basis of the term  used in Colossians 4, which carries the connotation of "cousin." Orthodox tradition holds that Aristobulus of Britannia, one of the Seventy Disciples, was the brother of Barnabas.

Name and etymologies 
(The "s" at the end is the Greek nominative case ending, and it is not present in the Aramaic form.) Another is that it is related to the Hebrew word  (Aramaic ) meaning "prophet". In the Syriac Bible, the phrase "son of consolation" is translated .

Biblical narrative 

Barnabas appears mainly in Acts, a history of the early Christian church. He also appears in several of Paul's epistles.

Barnabas, a native of Cyprus and a Levite, is first mentioned in the Acts of the Apostles as a member of the early Christian community in Jerusalem, who sold the land that he owned and gave the proceeds to the community. When the future Paul the Apostle returned to Jerusalem after his conversion, Barnabas introduced him to the apostles. Easton, in his Bible Dictionary, supposes that they had been fellow students in the school of Gamaliel.

The successful preaching of Christianity at Antioch to non-Jews led the church at Jerusalem to send Barnabas there to oversee the movement. He found the work so extensive and weighty that he went to Tarsus in search of Paul (still referred to as Saul), "an admirable colleague", to assist him. Paul returned with him to Antioch and labored with him for a whole year. At the end of this period, the two were sent up to Jerusalem (44 AD) with contributions from the church at Antioch for the relief of the poorer Christians in Judea.

They returned to Antioch taking John Mark with them, the cousin or nephew of Barnabas. Later, they went to Cyprus and some of the principal cities of Pamphylia, Pisidia, and Lycaonia. After recounting what the governor of Cyprus Sergius Paulus believed, Acts 13:9 speaks of Barnabas's spiritual brother no longer as Saul, but as Paul, his Roman name, and generally refers to the two no longer as "Barnabas and Saul" as heretofore, but as "Paul and Barnabas". Only in Acts 14:14 and Acts 15:12–25 does Barnabas again occupy the first place, in the first passage with recollection of Acts 14:12, in the last 2, because Barnabas stood in closer relation to the Jerusalem church than Paul. Paul appears as the more eloquent missionary, whence the Lystrans regarded him as Hermes and Barnabas as Zeus.

Acts 14:14 is also the unique biblical topic where Saint Barnabas is called with the Greek word for Apostle.

Returning from this first missionary journey to Antioch, they were again sent up to Jerusalem to consult with the church there regarding the relation of Gentiles to the church. According to Galatians 2:9–10, Barnabas was included with Paul in the agreement made between them, on the one hand, and James, Peter, and John, on the other, that the two former should in the future preach to the pagans, not forgetting the poor at Jerusalem. This matter having been settled, they returned again to Antioch, bringing the agreement of the council that Gentiles were to be admitted into the church without having to adopt Jewish practices.

After they had returned to Antioch from the Jerusalem council, they spent some time there. Peter came and associated freely there with the Gentiles, eating with them, until criticized for this by some disciples of James, as against Mosaic law. Upon their remonstrances, Peter yielded apparently through fear of displeasing them, and refused to eat any longer with the Gentiles. Barnabas followed his example. Paul considered that they "walked not uprightly according to the truth of the gospel" and upbraided them before the whole church. In Galatians 2:11–13, Paul says, "And when Kephas came to Antioch, I opposed him to his face because he clearly was wrong. For, until some people came from James, he used to eat with the Gentiles; but when they came, he began to draw back and separated himself, because he was afraid of the circumcised. And the rest of the Jews (also) acted hypocritically along with him, with the result that even Barnabas was carried away by their hypocrisy."

Paul then asked Barnabas to accompany him on another journey. Barnabas wished to take John Mark along, but Paul did not, as he had left them on the earlier journey. The dispute ended by Paul and Barnabas taking separate routes. Paul took Silas as his companion, and journeyed through Syria and Cilicia; while Barnabas took John Mark to visit Cyprus.

Little is known of the subsequent career of Barnabas. He was still living and labouring as an Apostle in 56 or 57, when Paul wrote 1 Corinthians (9:5–6), in which it is stated that he, too, like Paul, earned his own living. The reference indicates also that the friendship between the two was unimpaired. When Paul was a prisoner in Rome (61–63), John Mark was attached to him as a disciple, which is regarded as an indication that Barnabas was no longer living (Colossians 4:10).

Barnabas and Antioch 
Antioch, the third-most important city of the Roman Empire, then the capital city of Syria province, today Antakya, Turkey, was where Christians were first called thus.

Some of those who had been scattered by the persecution that arose because of Stephen went to Antioch, which became the site of an early Christian community. A considerable minority of the Antioch church of Barnabas's time belonged to the merchant class, and they provided support to the poorer Jerusalem church.

Martyrdom 

Church tradition developed outside of the canon of the New Testament describes the martyrdom of many saints, including the legend of the martyrdom of Barnabas. It relates that certain Jews coming to Syria and Salamis, where Barnabas was then preaching the gospel, being highly exasperated at his extraordinary success, fell upon him as he was disputing in the synagogue, dragged him out, and, after the most inhumane tortures, stoned him to death. His kinsman, John Mark, who was a spectator of this barbarous action, privately interred his body.

Although it is believed he was martyred by being stoned, the apocryphal Acts of Barnabas states that he was bound with a rope by the neck, and then being dragged only to the site where he would be burned to death.

According to the History of the Cyprus Church, in 478 Barnabas appeared in a dream to the Archbishop Anthemios of Cyprus and revealed to him the place of his sepulchre beneath a carob-tree. The following day Anthemios found the tomb and inside it the remains of Barnabas with a manuscript of Matthew's Gospel on his breast. Anthemios presented the Gospel to Emperor Zeno at Constantinople and received from him the privileges of the Greek Orthodox Church of Cyprus, that is, the purple cloak which the Greek Archbishop of Cyprus wears at festivals of the church, the imperial sceptre and the red ink with which he affixes his signature.

Anthemios then placed the venerable remains of Barnabas in a church which he founded near the tomb. Excavations near the site of a present-day church and monastery, have revealed an early church with two empty tombs, believed to be that of St. Barnabas and Anthemios.

St. Barnabas is venerated as the patron saint of Cyprus. He is also considered a patron saint in many other places in the world, highlighting 
Milan in Italy. On the island of Tenerife (Spain), St. Barnabas was invoked in historical times as patron saint and protector of the island's fields against drought, together with St. Benedict of Nursia.

Barnabas the Apostle is remembered in the Church of England with a festival on 11 June.

Other sources
Although many assume that the biblical Mark the cousin of Barnabas is the same as John Mark and Mark the Evangelist, the traditionally believed author of the Gospel of Mark, they are listed as three distinct people in Pseudo-Hippolytus' On the Seventy Apostles of Christ, which includes Barnabas himself as one of the Seventy-Two Disciples. There are two people named Barnabas among Hippolytus' list of Seventy Disciples, One (#13) became the bishop of Milan, the other (#25) the bishop of Heraclea. Most likely one of these two is the biblical Barnabas; the first one is more likely, because the numbering by Hippolytus seems to indicate a level of significance, and Barnabas is traditionally credited with founding the apostolic see of Milan. Clement of Alexandria also makes Barnabas one of the Seventy Disciples that are mentioned in the Gospel of Luke.

Other sources bring Barnabas to Rome and Alexandria. In the "Clementine Recognitions" (i, 7) he is depicted as preaching in Rome even during Christ's lifetime.

Cypriots developed the tradition of his later activity and martyrdom no earlier than the 3rd century. The question whether Barnabas was an apostle was often discussed during the Middle Ages.

Alleged writings 
Tertullian and other Western writers regard Barnabas as the author of the Letter to the Hebrews. This may have been the Roman tradition—which Tertullian usually follows—and in Rome the epistle may have had its first readers. Modern biblical scholarship considers its authorship unknown, though Barnabas amongst others has been proposed as potential authors.

“Photius of the ninth century, refers to some in his day who were uncertain whether the Acts was written by Clement of Rome, Barnabas, or Luke. Yet Photius is certain that the work must be ascribed to Luke.” 

He is also traditionally associated with the Epistle of Barnabas, although some modern scholars think it more likely that the epistle was written in Alexandria in the 130s. John Dominic Crossan quotes Koester as stating that New Testament writings are used "neither explicitly nor tacitly" in the Epistle of Barnabas and that this "would argue for an early date, perhaps even before the end of the first century AD." Crossan continues (The Cross that Spoke, p. 121):
Richardson and Shukster have also argued for a first-century date. Among several arguments they point to the detail of "a little king, who shall subdue three of the kings under one" and "a little crescent horn, and that it subdued under one three of the great horns" in Barnabas 4:4–5. They propose a composition "date during or immediately after the reign of Nerva (96–8 AD.) . . . viewed as bringing to an end the glorious Flavian dynasty of Vespasian, Titus, and Domitian . . . when a powerful, distinguished, and successful dynasty was brought low, humiliated by an assassin's knife" (33, 40).
In 16:3–4, the Epistle of Barnabas says: "Furthermore he says again, 'Lo, they who destroyed this temple shall themselves build it.' That is happening now. For owing to the war it was destroyed by the enemy; at present even the servants of the enemy will build it up again." This clearly places Barnabas after the destruction of the temple in 70 AD. But it also places Barnabas before the Bar Kochba revolt in 132 AD, after which there could have been no hope that the Romans would help to rebuild the temple. This shows that the document comes from the period between these two revolts.
Jay Curry Treat states on the dating of Barnabas (The Anchor Bible Dictionary, v. 1, pp. 613–614):
Since Barnabas 16:3 refers to the destruction of the temple, Barnabas must be written after 70 C.E. It must be written before its first indisputable use in Clement of Alexandria, ca. 190. Since 16:4 expects the temple to be rebuilt, it was most likely written before Hadrian built a Roman temple on the site ca. 135. Attempts to use 4:4–5 and 16:1–5 to specify the time of origin more exactly have not won wide agreement. It is important to remember that traditions of varying ages have been incorporated into this work.
Treat comments on the provenance of the Epistle of Barnabas (op. cit., p. 613):
Barnabas does not give enough indications to permit confident identification of either the teacher's location or the location to which he writes. His thought, hermeneutical methods, and style have many parallels throughout the known Jewish and Christian worlds. Most scholars have located the work's origin in the area of Alexandria, on the grounds that it has many affinities with Alexandrian Jewish and Christian thought and because its first witnesses are Alexandrian. Recently, Prigent (Prigent and Kraft 1971: 20–24), Wengst (1971: 114–18), and Scorza Barcellona (1975: 62–65) have suggested other origins based on affinities in Palestine, Syria, and Asia Minor. The place of origin must remain an open question, although the Greek-speaking E. Mediterranean appears most probable.
Concerning the relationship between Barnabas and the New Testament, Treat writes (op. cit., p. 614):
Although Barnabas 4:14 appears to quote Matt 22:14, it must remain an open question whether the Barnabas circle knew written gospels. Based on Koester's analysis (1957: 125–27, 157), it appears more likely that Barnabas stood in the living oral tradition used by the written gospels. For example, the reference to gall and vinegar in Barnabas 7:3, 5 seems to preserve an early stage of tradition that influenced the formation of the passion narratives in the Gospel of Peter and the synoptic gospels.

The 5th century Decretum Gelasianum includes a Gospel of Barnabas amongst works condemned as apocryphal; but no certain text or quotation from this work has been identified.

Another book using that same title, the Gospel of Barnabas, survives in two post-medieval manuscripts in Italian and Spanish. Contrary to the canonical Christian Gospels, and in accordance with the Islamic view of Jesus, this later Gospel of Barnabas states that Jesus was not the son of God, but a prophet and messenger.

The Barnabites
In 1538, the Catholic religious order officially known as "Clerics Regular of St. Paul" (Clerici Regulares Sancti Pauli), gained the grand old Monastery of Saint Barnabas by the city wall of Milan as their main seat. The Order was thenceforth known by the popular name of Barnabites.

See also 
 Catholic Church in Cyprus
 Lectionary 214 – apocryphal Apodemia of Barnabas
 List of early Christian saints
 Saint Barnabas, patron saint archive

Notes

References

 Attwater, Donald and Catherine Rachel John. "The Penguin Dictionary of Saints," 3rd edition, New York: Penguin Books, 1993. 

 

Attribution:

Further reading

 Die Apostolischen Väter. Griechisch-deutsche Parallelausgabe. J.C.B. Mohr Tübingen 1992. 
 Der Barnabasbrief. Übersetzt und erklärt von Ferdinand R. Prostmeier. Series: Kommentar zu den Apostolischen Vätern (KAV, Vol. 8). Vandenhoeck & Ruprecht: Göttingen 1999.

External links 
 The Epistle of Barnabas
 St. Barnabas the Apostle
 St Barnabas Monastery and Icon Museum, Famagusta, Cyprus
 St. Barnabas at the Christian Iconography web site.
 The Life of St. Barnabas the Apostle in Caxton's translation of the Golden Legend

1st-century Italian bishops
1st-century Christian martyrs
1st-century Christian theologians
1st-century writers
1st-century Jews
Anglican saints
Archbishops of Milan
Biblical apostles
Burials in Cyprus
Christian saints from the New Testament
Christian writers
Cypriot Jews
Cypriot saints
Early Jewish Christians
Eastern Catholic saints
Jewish writers
Jews and Judaism in Cyprus
People from Famagusta
People in the Pauline epistles
Prophets of the New Testament
Seventy disciples
Year of birth unknown